Viktor Lvovich Kirpichov (Saint Petersburg, Russian Empire – , Saint Petersburg, Russian Empire) was a prominent Russian Imperial engineer, physicist, and educational organizer, known especially for his work on applied and structural mechanics as well as for establishing the foundations for technical education in the Russian Empire.

Early biography 
Viktor Lvovich Kirpichov belonged to Russian nobility from St. Petersburg. He graduated from the Polotsk military school (1862) and St.Michael artillery school in Saint Petersburg (1863). In 1863–1870 he was in the faculty of Kronstadt military academy where he taught material science and mechanics. In 1873 he was a postdoc student of Gustav Kirchhoff in Germany. After that, until his move to Ukraine in 1885, he was a professor at Saint Petersburg Technological Institute. In 1882, he was responsible for investigation of the Borki train disaster.

University founder in the south of the Russian Empire  
Viktor Kirpichov is the most widely known in modern-day Ukraine as the founder and first rector of two prominent technical universities in this country (then a part of the Russian Empire): 
 Kharkov Polytechnic Institute of Emperor Alexander III (a rector in 1885–1898) 
 Kiev Polytechnic Institute of Emperor Alexander II (a rector in 1898–1902)
Founding these universities was a part of wide program of technical education in the Russian Empire set up by Dmitriy Mendeleev. Professor Kirpichov was a prominent provider of this program serving as a 
member of both a Working Committee for elaborating the project of common plan for professional education in the Russian Empire (1884), and the Committee for higher education (1897).

USA visit 
In 1893, Kirpichov was invited to USA, where he was an expert at the Chicago world's fair and visited numerous engineering facilities.

Later years 
During his last years, Professor Kirpichov returned to Saint Petersburg, where he taught applied mechanics in Saint Petersburg Technological Institute. He remained a Honored Professor of Kiev Polytechnic Institute until the end of his life.

He was buried at the Lutheran Volkovo Cemetery, Saint Petersburg.

References

Biography

Engineers from Saint Petersburg
Academic staff of Military Engineering-Technical University
1845 births
1913 deaths
Kyiv Polytechnic Institute rectors
Privy Councillor (Russian Empire)
Academic staff of the Saint Petersburg State Institute of Technology